Pedro Silva Torrejón is an Argentinian professional footballer who plays as a left back for Uruguayan Primera División club Boston River.

Club career

Early career
Torrejón began his club career at the age of 10 following a successful trial at Boca Juniors. Originally a midfielder, he has since become accustomed to a more defensive role at the instruction of Juan Simón.

Boca Juniors
On 2 January 2016, Torrejón signed his first professional contract with Boca Juniors, making his debut in a 1–0 defeat to Argentinos Juniors on 30 January 2016.

Middlesbrough
On 2 February 2017, it was announced that Torrejón would join Middlesbrough on loan for the remainder of the 2016–17 season with an option to buy, serving as reinforcement for the club's U23 side.

Boston River
On 24 January 2019, Torrejón signed with Uruguayan Primera División club Boston River.

References

Living people
1997 births
Argentine footballers
Argentine expatriate footballers
Argentine Primera División players
Uruguayan Primera División players
Boca Juniors footballers
Middlesbrough F.C. players
Olimpo footballers
Boston River players
Sportspeople from Córdoba Province, Argentina
Association football defenders
Argentine expatriate sportspeople in England
Argentine expatriate sportspeople in Uruguay
Expatriate footballers in England
Expatriate footballers in Uruguay